El Problemá is a song by Russian hip-hop artists Morgenshtern and Timati. The track was supposed to be published on September 18, 2020, but on September 17, 2020, it was leaked.

Prehistory
On July 4, 2020, Russian beatmaker Slava Marlow and sound producer along with Morgenshtern released a video on YouTube, in which artists suggested Timati produce the track, write the lyrics and promote the song. The main condition was that the song should not be changed by Timati.

On July 6, 2020, Timati posted a video on YouTube in which he accepted the artists' offer, but with the condition that they take part in the video for the song, and the video will have as much advertising as Timati wants.

On August 20, 2020, articles on some websites appeared that Slava, Morgenshtern, and Timati are in Sochi for filming their new clip. Among the locations was a casino.

On August 22, 2020, Morgenstern and Slava published a response to Timati's video, in which they accepted updated terms.

The day before the single's release, on September 17, 2020, the song was leaked on YouTube.

References

2020 songs
2020 singles
Russian pop songs
Morgenshtern songs